Public Bank (Hong Kong) Limited (Chinese: 大眾銀行(香港)有限公司) is a licensed bank in Hong Kong. Originally named Asia Commercial Bank Limited and owned by Asia Financial Holdings Limited (SEHK: 662), it was acquired by Public Financial Holdings Limited (SEHK: 626, a Public Bank Berhad subsidiary, formerly known as JCG Financial Holdings Limited), completed on 30 May, 2006. It was subsequently renamed on 30 June, 2006.

It was established in Hong Kong in the 1930s.

It has 32 branches in Hong Kong; 1 branch and 4 sub-branches in Shenzhen and a representative office each in Shanghai and Shenyang in the PRC.

Board Executive Committee 
 Tan Sri Dato’ Sri Dr. Teh Hong Piow (鄭鴻標) (Chairman) (Demise)
 Tan Sri Dato’ Sri Tay Ah Lek
 Dato’ Chang Kat Kiam
 Mr. Tan Yoke Kong
 Mr. Chong Yam Kiang

See also 
 List of banks in Hong Kong

External links 
 Official website

Banks of Hong Kong
Banks established in the 1930s